Juliet Macur is an American journalist.

Biography
Macur is from Bridgewater Township, New Jersey, born to Catholic Polish immigrant parents, and attended Bridgewater-Raritan High School West. She attended Barnard College at Columbia University, graduating with a bachelor's degree in History and Political Science in 1992. She went on to graduate with a master's degree from the Columbia University Graduate School of Journalism in 1997.

While in college Macur was captain of the Columbia University rowing team. After college she rowed competitively for the New York Athletic Club. She went on to work as a sports journalist, reporting on Dallas Cowboys head coach Bill Parcells, the Jacksonville Jaguars, the Olympics and motorsports.

Macur has worked for the Orlando Sentinel and The Dallas Morning News. She moved to The New York Times in 2004. Macur wrote a biography of champion cyclist Lance Armstrong which became a best selling book. Her work has twice been anthologized in the Best American Sports Writing series. She has also been named one of the top 10 sports columnists in the United States by the Associated Press Sports Editors.
 
In 2016, Macur was a fellow at the University of Chicago Institute of Politics. She currently lives in Washington, D.C.

Awards
  National Press Club
 Associated Press Sports Editors
 Society of Professional Journalists
 New York Press Club
 The Sidney Award
 Newswomen's Club of New York

Bibliography
 Cycle of Lies: The Fall of Lance Armstrong, New York, 2014.

References and sources

Living people
American sports journalists
American women sportswriters
Barnard College alumni
Bridgewater-Raritan High School alumni
Columbia University Graduate School of Journalism alumni
People from Bridgewater Township, New Jersey
Date of birth missing (living people)
Year of birth missing (living people)
21st-century American women